Herbert Fortier (1867 – 16 February 1949) was a Canadian actor of the silent era. He appeared in more than 50 films between 1915 and 1937. He was born in Toronto and died in Philadelphia, Pennsylvania. In 1913 he lived with his wife Frances in Newfield, New Jersey.

Partial filmography
 The Ringtailed Rhinoceros (1915)
 The City of Failing Light (1916)
 The Gulf Between (1917)
 Who's Your Brother? (1919)
 A Connecticut Yankee in King Arthur's Court (1921)
 Beyond (1921)
 The Shark Master (1921)
 Garments of Truth (1921)
 Midnight (1922)
 The Black Bag (1922)
 Dusk to Dawn (1922)
 Little Wildcat (1922)
 The Eagle's Talons (1923)
 The Clean Up (1923)
 Thundering Dawn (1923)
 Railroaded (1923)
 Slander the Woman (1923)
 Legally Dead (1923)
 Ridgeway of Montana (1924)
 The Whispered Name (1924)

References

External links

1867 births
1949 deaths
20th-century Canadian male actors
Canadian male film actors
Canadian male silent film actors
Canadian expatriate male actors in the United States
Male actors from New Jersey
Male actors from Toronto
People from Gloucester County, New Jersey